Deep Dark Ocean is a 1997 album by British folk rock band Oysterband.

Track listing
 "Sail On By" (John Jones, Alan Prosser, Ian Telfer) - 3:33
 "Little Brother" (Jones, Prosser, Telfer) - 3:12
 "Only When You Call" (Jones, Prosser, Telfer) - 3:34
 "Native Son" (Jones, Prosser, Telfer) - 4:40
 "Not Like Jordan" (Prosser, Telfer) - 3:57
 "North Star" (Ray "Chopper" Cooper, Prosser) - 1:30
 "Milford Haven" (Jones, Prosser, Telfer) - 3:45
 "The Story" (Prosser, Telfer) - 4:23
 "Be My Luck" (Prosser, Telfer) - 2:48
 "No Reason to Cry" (Jones, Prosser, Telfer) - 4:48
 "Drunkard's Waltz" (Rev Hammer) - 3:14 / "Native Son (Welsh language version)" (Jones, Prosser, Telfer) - 1:28 (hidden track)

References

1997 albums
Oysterband albums
Cooking Vinyl albums